Aston Villa F.C. started the 1910–11 season as champions, so opened the season in the Charity Shield game against Southern League champions Brighton & Hove Albion. Brighton are the only club to win just the Shield but never the FA Cup or the League. In the five years that the Charity Shield was contested by the winners of the Football League and Southern League between 1908 and 1912, this was the only occasion on which the Southern League champions prevailed. The victory remains Brighton's only national honour to date and they, not Aston Villa, were crowned the 'Champions of all England'.

Villa drew their opening home league 1-1 against visitors, Oldham Athletic. They lost their first away match match 3-2 at Sunderland. The third match saw their first win, and first clean sheet, of the season. Before a crowd of 20,000 Villa beat Woolwich Arsenal 3-0 with Jock Logan, future war casualty Billy Gerrish and Bill Renneville scoring.

Final League table

Results

References

External links
AVFC History: 1910–11 season

Aston Villa F.C. seasons
Aston Villa F.C.
1911